Holstein-Itzehoe was a county that was formed from Schauenburg and Holstein by the division of Holstein between Gerhard and John in 1261.

Gerhard of Holstein-Itzehoe was the only regent. After his death in 1290 Holstein-Itzehoe was divided up between Gerhard's sons into the three counties of Holstein-Rendsburg, Holstein-Plön and Holstein-Pinneberg (the latter ruled in personal union with the County of Schauenburg, thus sometimes called Holstein and Schauenburg, or Holstein-Schauenburg, however Schauenburg was the name of the ruling dynasty in all the then Holsatian counties).

Rise and fall of the county 

Itzehoe
 
Counties of the Holy Roman Empire
Holstein